T.I. Ahmadiyya Senior High School (Real Amass) is a coeducational second-cycle public educational institution in Kumasi in the Ashanti Region of Ghana.

History
The school was established by the Ahmadiyya Muslim Mission, Ghana, on 30 January 1950.

List of headmasters

Notable alumni and associates
 Abdul Wahab Adam – national president, Ahmadiyya Muslim Mission, Ghana
 Mohammed Ahmed Alhassan – Inspector General of Police 
Georgina Opoku Amankwah, lawyer and former deputy Chairperson Electoral Commission of Ghana
Habiba Atta Forson, football administrator, founder of Fabulous Ladies FC and GFA executive committee member
Gyakie - Musician
 Augustine Collins Ntim – member of parliament, Parliament of Ghana (for the Offinso North parliament constituency)
Atsu Nyamadi  – Ghanaian Athlete
Sandra Owusu-Ansah – Ghanaian footballer, Ghana women's national football team
 Joshua Owusu – gold-medal recipient, 1974 British Commonwealth Games 
 Mariama Owusu – Active justice of the Supreme Court of Ghana (2019–)
 Blakk Rasta (né Abubakar Ahmed) – reggae musician and radio presenter
 Strongman (Ghanaian Rapper) - Hip Hop artist
 Diana Yankey – gold medal recipient, 1989 African Championships in Athletics and 1990 African Championships in Athletics

See also

 Education in Ghana 🇬🇭 
 Islam in Ghana
 List of senior high schools in the Ashanti Region

References

1950 establishments in Gold Coast (British colony)
Ahmadiyya educational institutions
Educational institutions established in 1950
High schools in Ghana
Islam in Ghana
Islamic secondary schools in Africa
Education in Kumasi
Religious schools in Ghana